Football Club Zestafoni is a Georgian football club based in Zestafoni. They play their home games at David Abashidze Stadium. Zestafoni was founded on 18 June 2004 by the initiative of the shareholders of JSC Giorgi Nikoladze Zestafoni Ferro-Alloy Plant.

At that time Zestafoni have their own club FC Metallurg Zestafoni. A new club was formed as Margveti Zestafoni joined Pirveli Liga and promoted in the first season. Margveti was a member of Umaglesi Liga and achieved their best result in 1995–96 by finishing runner-up.

History

FC Metalurgi Zestafoni (1937–1989)
From the beginning of the 20th century football was given rise in Georgia. In 1906 the first football fan club was founded in Tbilisi. This happened by the patronage of Mr. Lgotac. He was the one who on 23 February 1907 established the first football club in Georgia. The club, called "Comet", had its own regulations, funds, uniforms and a stadium.

Though it should be mentioned, that football was played far earlier in Georgia, mainly in the sea-side cities, first of all in Poti, where local groups competed in "passing/tossing a ball" with British mariners. That's why Poti is considered to be a cradle of Georgian football.

As to Zestafoni, in out city, football has been played since the beginning of the 20th century. First football players from Zestafoni were students of the local gymnasium (currently secondary school #1). According to our data, Zestafoni football team held its first match with one of the clubs of western Georgia (according to different sources Senaki or Ozurgeti) in 1918, during a celebration organized to commemorate Independence of Georgia. First international match held in Zestafoni was also during the independence period, in 1920. Zestafoni team competed with a group of British Occupational Forces and defeated it by 2–1.

In the 1920s Zestafoni football players held various matches with teams of neighboring cities.
In 1927 first Football Championship in held in Georgia. First Champion of Georgia is Team of Batumi.

In the 1930s two football teams are established in Zestafoni – "Mertskhali" (Swallow) and "Locomotive", that often take part in local and regional tournaments.

A truly new era in the history of Zestafoni football starts form the second half of the 1930s, after a metallurgical giant, "Zestafoni Ferro-Alloy Plant", has been put into exploitation. It was by the initiative of professional committee of the plant, that a meeting of workers of the physical culture was held on 10 May 1937. A decision of establishing a football team was made on the meeting. The team was called "Metallurgi".

In August 1938, "Metallurgi" participates in the union tournament held by sport-society "Metallurgist" in Minsk, where the team defeats "Electrostal Moscow", "Krasni Oktiabr Staliningrad", "Metallurg Leningrad" and loses in final to "Serp i Molot". In 1938 FC Metallurgi Zestafoni is engaged in Georgian Championship, where it participates regularly until 1989.

In various years of Soviet era "Metallurgi" was:

Silver medalist of Georgian Championship – 1967, 1970, 1982;

Runners-Up of Georgian Cup – 1966, 1967, 1971 years;

Georgian Cup's Winner – 1962.

Various football players from "Metallurgi" played for leading Georgian football clubs on various degrees, for example: Lokomotivi Tbilisi – Guram Shavdia, Zaur Chubinidze; Torpedo Kutaisi – Guram Nishnianidze; Dinamo Tbilisi – Giorgi (Jora) Chumburidze, Guram Kochiashvili, Dodik Khundadze, Guram Petriashvili, Kartlos Tsintsadze, Nodar Kiknadze.

Margveti Zestafoni (1990–2000)
In 1990 Georgian Football Federation leaves the Soviet Union's Football Federation. An Independent Georgian Football Federation is formed, that shortly after becomes a member of FIFA and UEFA, leading Georgian Clubs are engaged in National Championships.

In 1990 a new Football Club is founded in Zestafoni – FC Margveti Zestafoni, that holds the position of "Metallurgi" in Pirveli League of the Georgian National Championship and from the very first year becomes a member of Umaglesi league.

In 1993 and 1996 years "Margveti" is the semi-finalist of the Georgian National Cup. In 1996 "Margveti" is the Vice-Champion of Georgia and participates in UEFA Cup Qualification Round. Unfortunately, due to financial problems, at the end of the 20th century the club broke up.

In total, in the years of 1991–1998 FC "Margveti" participated in Umaglesi League 8 National Championships, held 247 matches, won 98 of them, draw 43, lost – 106, difference in scores 397–443.

In 2006 "Margveti-2006" was founded in the lower division and recently in Meore Liga, but it is different (municipal) club.

{|class="wikitable"
|-bgcolor="#efefef"
! Season
! League
! Pos.
! Pl.
! W
! D
! L
! GF
! GA
! P
! Cup
! Europe
! Notes
|-
|align=right|1990
|align=right|Pirveli Liga
|align=right bgcolor=silver|2
|align=right|38||align=right|28||align=right|3||align=right|7
|align=right|102||align=right|44||align=right|87
|rowspan=2|Round of 32
|rowspan=3 align=center|N/A
|bgcolor=#ccffcc|Promoted
|-
|align=right|1991
|align=right|Umaglesi Liga
|align=right|8
|align=right|19||align=right|8||align=right|3||align=right|8
|align=right|32||align=right|32||align=right|27
|
|-
|align=right|1991–92
|align=right|Umaglesi Liga
|align=right|8
|align=right|38||align=right|14||align=right|11||align=right|13
|align=right|60||align=right|58||align=right|53
|Round of 16
|
|-
|align=right|1992–93
|align=right|Umaglesi Liga
|align=right|6
|align=right|32||align=right|15||align=right|5||align=right|12
|align=right|49||align=right|54||align=right|50
|bgcolor=cc9966|Semi-finals
|
|
|-
|align=right|1993–94
|align=right|Umaglesi Liga
|align=right|8
|align=right|38 ||align=right|15 ||align=right|7 ||align=right|16
|align=right|71 ||align=right|68 ||align=right|20/18
|–
|
|
|-
|align=right|1994–95
|align=right|Umaglesi Liga
|align=right|9
|align=right|30||align=right|10||align=right|6||align=right|14
|align=right|35||align=right|53||align=right|36
|Round of 32
|
|
|-
|align=right|1995–96
|align=right|Umaglesi Liga
|align=right bgcolor=silver|2
|align=right|30||align=right|22||align=right|2||align=right|6
|align=right|85||align=right|37||align=right|68
|bgcolor=cc9966|Semi-finals
|
|
|-
|align=right|1996–97
|align=right|Umaglesi Liga
|align=right|7
|align=right|30||align=right|12||align=right|2||align=right|16
|align=right|44||align=right|66||align=right|38
|Quarter-finals
|UEFA Cup Preliminary round
|
|-
|align=right|1997–98
|align=right|Umaglesi Liga
|align=right bgcolor=#FFBBBB|16
|align=right|30||align=right|2||align=right|7||align=right|21
|align=right|21||align=right|75||align=right|13
|Round of 32
|
|bgcolor=#FFBBBB| Relegated
|-
|align=right|1998–99
|align=right|Pirveli liga
|align=right bgcolor=silver|2
|align=right|24||align=right|18||align=right|4||align=right|2
|align=right|78||align=right|24||align=right|58
|Round of 32
|
|-
|align=right|1999–00
|align=right|Pirveli liga West Group A
|align=right bgcolor=#ccffcc|1
|align=right|22||align=right|18||align=right|4||align=right|0
|align=right|71||align=right|18||align=right|58
|Round of 16
|
|}

Metalurgi Zestafoni (1999–2004)
As FC Margveti Zestafoni faced financial problem and relegated in 1998. A new club using the city legend team name Metallurgi Zestafoni was formed in 1999. The club promoted to Umaglesi Liga in 2001. But the club faced financial problem and relegated in 2003. In 2003–04, the club finished bottom in Pirveli Liga and disestablished .

{|class="wikitable"
|-bgcolor="#efefef"
! Season
! League
! Pos.
! Pl.
! W
! D
! L
! GF
! GA
! P
! Cup
! Europe
! Notes
|-
|align=right|1999–00
|align=right|Pirveli liga West Group A
|align=right |4
|align=right|22||align=right|12||align=right|5||align=right|5
|align=right|42||align=right|27||align=right|41
|Round of 32
|
|
|-
|align=right|2000–01
|align=right|Pirveli liga
|align=right bgcolor=silver|2
|align=right|32||align=right|17||align=right|8||align=right|7
|align=right|48||align=right|31||align=right|42/38
|Round of 16
|
|bgcolor=#ccffcc|Promoted
|-
|align=right|2001–2002
|align=right|Umaglesi Liga
|align=right|9
|align=right|32||align=right|9||align=right|10||align=right|13
|align=right|33||align=right|44||align=right|37
|Round of 16
|
|
|-
|align=right|2002–2003
|align=right|Umaglesi Liga
|align=right bgcolor=#FFBBBB|12
|align=right|32||align=right|6||align=right|1||align=right|25
|align=right|17||align=right|79||align=right|19
|Round of 32
|
|bgcolor=#FFBBBB|Relegated
|-
|align=right|2003–04
|align=right|Pirveli liga
|align=right bgcolor=#FFBBBB|16
|align=right|30||align=right|2||align=right|1||align=right|27
|align=right|18||align=right|87||align=right|7
|Round of 32
|
|bgcolor=#ccffcc|Initially relegated, but after the merger with FC Zestafoni were promoted to the Umaglesi Liga 
|-
|}

FC Zestafoni (2004–present)
On 18 June 2004, FC Zestafoni was incorporated. The club was invited to join Umaglesi Liga. Although, FC Metallurgi, FC Margveti and FC Zestafoni came from the same city, played on same stadium. They never met in the Umaglesi league and all clubs came from the succession of Metallurg Zestafoni.

{|class="wikitable"
|-bgcolor="#efefef"
! Season
! League
! Pos.
! Pl.
! W
! D
! L
! GF
! GA
! P
! Cup
! Europe
! Notes
|-
|2004–05
|Umaglesi Liga
|align=right|5
|align=right|36||align=right|16||align=right|5||align=right|15
|align=right|38||align=right|48||align=right|53
|bgcolor=silver|Runner-up
| –
|
|-
|2005–06
|Umaglesi Liga
|align=right|4
|align=right|30||align=right|18||align=right|7||align=right|5
|align=right|44||align=right|22||align=right|61
|bgcolor=silver|Runner-up
| –
|
|-
|2006–07
|Umaglesi Liga
|align=right|4
|align=right|26||align=right|16||align=right|9||align=right|1
|align=right|55||align=right|11||align=right|57
|bgcolor=silver|Runner-up
| –
|
|-
|2007–08
|Umaglesi Liga
|bgcolor=cc9966 align=right|3
|align=right|26||align=right|18||align=right|5||align=right|3
|align=right|56||align=right|16||align=right|59
|bgcolor=gold|Winner
|Intertoto 1st Round
|
|-
|2008–09
|Umaglesi Liga
|align=right|4
|align=right|30||align=right|16||align=right|4||align=right|10
|align=right|43||align=right|27||align=right|52
|Quarter-finals
|UEFA Cup 1st qualifying round
|
|-
|2009–10
|Umaglesi Liga
|bgcolor=cc9966 align=right|3
|align=right|36 ||align=right|19 ||align=right|10 ||align=right|7
|align=right|58 ||align=right|33 ||align=right|67
|Quarter-finals
|UEFA Europa League 2nd qualifying round
|
|-
|2010–11
|Umaglesi Liga
|bgcolor=gold align=right|1
|align=right|36 ||align=right|24 ||align=right|6 ||align=right|6
|align=right|72 ||align=right|19 ||align=right|78
|bgcolor=cc9966|Semi-finals
|UEFA Europa League 3rd qualifying round
|
|-
|2011–12
|Umaglesi Liga
|bgcolor=gold align=right|1
|align=right|36 ||align=right|24 ||align=right|7 ||align=right|5
|align=right|73 ||align=right|33 ||align=right|79
|bgcolor=silver|Runner-up
|2011–12 UEFA Champions League 3rd qualifying round
UEFA Europa League Play-offs
|
|-
|2012–13
|Umaglesi Liga
|align=right|5
|align=right|32||align=right|12||align=right|6||align=right|14
|align=right|35||align=right|38||align=right|42
|Round of 16
|2012–13 UEFA Champions League 2nd qualifying round
|
|-
|2013–14
|Umaglesi Liga
|bgcolor=silver align=right|2
|align=right|32||align=right|19||align=right|5 ||align=right|8
|align=right|48 ||align=right|23 ||align=right|62
|Round of 16
| –
| 
|-
|2014–15
|Umaglesi Liga
|align=right|16
|align=right|30||align=right|6||align=right|8 ||align=right|16 
|align=right|40 ||align=right|61 ||align=right|26
|Round of 16
|UEFA Europa League 2nd qualifying round
|bgcolor=#BBBBBB|Expelled
|-
|2018
|Regionuli Liga
|align=right|4
|align=right|28||align=right|17||align=right|2||align=right|9
|align=right|60||align=right|33||align=right|23/30
|Second round
|
|
|-
|2019
|Regionuli Liga
|bgcolor=silver align=right|2
|align=right|27||align=right|20||align=right|5||align=right|2
|align=right|100||align=right|29||align=right|23/42
| Round of 32
| 
|bgcolor=#ccffcc| Promotion to Liga 4
|-
|2020
|Liga 4
|align=right|6
|align=right|14||align=right|4||align=right|4||align=right|6
|align=right|22||align=right|20||align=right|16
| Second round
|
|
|-
|2021
|Liga 4
|bgcolor=silver align=right|2
|align=right|36||align=right|23||align=right|9||align=right|4
|align=right|76||align=right|27||align=right|41/37
| Round of 32
|
|bgcolor=#ccffcc| Promotion to Liga 3
|-
|2022
|Liga 3
|bgcolor=#FFBBBB align=right|15
|align=right|30||align=right|4||align=right|3||align=right|23
|align=right|18||align=right|77||align=right|15
|Second round
|
|
|}

Stadium
David Abashidze stadium was built by "Zestafoni Ferro-alloy Plant", started operating in 1952. Though a couple of matches were held on the stadium before its opening in 1951.

In 1952–1989 and 1999–2003 participant of Georgian Championship, FC Metallurgi held matches on the Zestafoni central stadium, in 1990–1998 it was a home stadium for FC Margveti.

Since 2004 FC Zestafoni is holding domestic matches on the stadium.

In 1981 reconstruction works were done on arena, west stand was roofed, east stand was constructed, after these works capacity of the Stadium increased to 8,000 seats.

In 2004, after establishing FC Zestafoni, central Stadium was repaired and is still being repaired to renew the arena and comply with international standards.

In 2005 works were done to renew the grass surface on the Stadium. Georgian workers have constructed new drainage system of German technology. Field is watered by a watering system of an American Company "Rainbird" (by the way this watering system was successfully used on 8 Stadiums during 2004 European Championship in Portugal).

On the David Abashidze Stadium (former Central) Stadium field surface "Natural Green Carpet" is made by the Ukrainian firm "Lidia-Park".

FC Zestafoni management is building a new base for the club. Many new football fields have been constructed in Zestafoni (among them one with an artificial surface). Relevant infrastructure is being made – work out rooms are being repaired, building of a new tribunes with personal seats is planned, along with the installment of a modern score-board.

Today capacity of the Stadium increased to 4,558 individual seats.

On 9 April 2010 the stadium was named after David Abashidze who contributed tremendously to the development and revival of football in Zestafoni.

Honors

Erovnuli Liga
Champions: 2010–11, 2011–12

Georgian Cup
Champions: 2007–08

Georgian Super Cup
Champions: 2011, 2012

Zestafonian Clubs in Georgian Umaglesi Liga

FC Zestafoni. All competitions statistic

European Cups

Goals in Georgian Umaglesi Liga

Topscorers

Topscorers by season

Matches in Georgian Umaglesi Liga

Current squad

Management and Team's staff

Managers
 Vladimir Zemlianoi (18 June 2004 – 18 September 2004)
 Zaza Gurielidze (20 September 2004 – 2 October 2004)
 Teimuraz Makharadze (5 Oct 2004 – 14 October 2005)
 Koba Zhorzhikashvili (15 Oct 2005 – 12 November 2005)
 Teimuraz Makharadze (13 Nov 2005 – 30 March 2006)
 Koba Zhorzhikashvili (31 March 2006 – 30 May 2006)
 Merab Kochlashvili (1 June 2006 – 30 August 2006)
 Teimuraz Makharadze (1 September 2006 – 30 November 2008)
 Gia Geguchadze (1 Dec 2008 – 16 August 2011)
 Giorgi Chiabrishvili (18 Aug 2011 – 12 September 2012)
 Davit Mujiri and Zaza Zamtaradze (14 September 2012 – 10 December 2012)
 Kakhaber Kacharava (13 Dec 2012 – 31 May 2013)
 Ratko Dostanić (15 July 2013 – 1 November 2013)
 Gia Geguchadze (5 Nov 2013 – 31 December 2014)
 Giorgi Mikadze (2015)
 Guram Mazmishvili (2018)
 Malkhaz Gongadze (2018-2020)
 Levan Jokhadze (2020)

References

External links

Official website
Fan-club website 
Soccerway.com

Zestafoni
Association football clubs established in 2004
2004 establishments in Georgia (country)